Sajevče is a small village in the hills south of Hruševje in the Municipality of Postojna in the Inner Carniola region of Slovenia.

References

External links
Sajevče on Geopedia

Populated places in the Municipality of Postojna